eBid is an auction website.

EBID may refer to:
 Electron beam-induced deposition, a nanoscale deposition technique
 Evidence-based individual decision making, see Evidence-based medicine